Kong Pyek is a small town in Loikaw Township, Loikaw District, in the northern part of Kayah State of eastern Burma. It is located south of Tongkaw in Shan State along National Highway 5.

References

External links
Maplandia World Gazetteer

Populated places in Kayah State